Glassverket IF is a handball club from Drammen, Norway. They currently compete in the 1. divisjon.

The club also plays football and used to play bandy.

Kits

Honours
Norwegian League:
Bronze: 2015/2016, 2016/2017
Silver: 2014/2015
Norwegian Cup:
Silver: 2015

European record

Team

Current squad
Squad for the 2018-19 season 

Goalkeeper
 1  Renate Resvoll Holm
 12  Silje Johannessen
 16  Mia Stensland
Wingers
RW
 5  Martine Håkonsen
LW 
 3  Nina Bull-Engelstad
 6  Charlotte Aasbø
Line players
 7  Marte Figenschau
 8  Julia Vangen

Back players
 5  Martine Skjærvik Håkonsen
 9  Rikke Klausen
 11  Linn Andresen
 14  Emilie Sjøgren
 15  Renate Saastad Sømme
 17  Siren Landsverk Hals
 22  Freja Christensen

2018-2019 Transfers

Joining

Leaving
  Thale Rushfeldt Deila (to  Fredrikstad BK)
  Live Rushfeldt Deila (to  Skrim Kongsberg)
  Irene Fanton (to  Mosonmagyaróvári KC SE)
  Trine Bronsta (to  Skrim Kongsberg)
  Amalie Henriette Finrud Jøsendal (to  Fana)

Technical staff
 Head coach: Christoffer Torget Moseng
 Assistant coach: Espen Fossli Olaussen

References

External links
 Official website 
 EHF Profile

Norwegian handball clubs
Handball clubs established in 1919
Association football clubs established in 1919
Bandy clubs established in 1919
Sport in Drammen
1919 establishments in Norway
Defunct bandy clubs in Norway